William Thomas Pocock (24 February 1894 — 4 February 1959) was an English footballer who played as an outside left.

Career
Bill Pocock played locally for Bedminster St Francis before joining the Army. Joe Palmer signed him in July 1919 for Bristol City.

Honours
with Bristol City
Football League Third Division South winner: 1922–23
FA Cup semi-finalist 1920

References

1894 births
1959 deaths
Footballers from Bristol
English footballers
Association football wingers
English Football League players
Bath City F.C. players
St Johnstone F.C. players
Bristol City F.C. players